Gala Y.M. RFC is a rugby union club based in Galashiels, Scotland.

History

The club was founded in 1928.

Sides

Training is on Thursday nights at 7pm on the back pitches at Netherdale.

Sevens tournament

The club runs the Gala Y.M. Sevens.

Notable players

Scotland internationalists

The following former Gala Y.M. players have represented Scotland at full international level.
  Norman Bruce

Honours

Mens

 Dumfries Sevens
 Champions (7): 1973, 1978, 1979, 1983, 1985, 1986
 Lasswade Sevens
 Champions (3): 1956, 1958, 2015
 Haddingon Sevens
 Champions (8): 1929, 1930, 1931, 1959, 1967, 1979, 1988, 1991
 South of Scotland District Sevens
 Champions (2): 1984, 1991
 North Berwick Sevens
 Champions (3): 1963, 1967, 1978

References

Rugby union in the Scottish Borders
Scottish rugby union teams